Yur Mahalleh (also Romanized as Yūr Maḩalleh; also known as Yūr) is a village in Esfivard-e Shurab Rural District, in the Central District of Sari County, Mazandaran Province, Iran. At the 2006 census, its population was 212, in 56 families.

References 

Populated places in Sari County